This is a list of people who have served as Custos Rotulorum of Sussex.

 Sir William Shelley bef. 1544–1549
 Sir Richard Sackville 1549–1566
 Thomas Sackville, 1st Earl of Dorset bef. 1573–1608
 Thomas Howard, 21st Earl of Arundel 1608–1636
 Henry Howard, Baron Maltravers 1636–1646
 Interregnum
 Algernon Percy, 10th Earl of Northumberland 1660–1668
 Joceline Percy, 11th Earl of Northumberland 1668–1670
 Richard Sackville, 5th Earl of Dorset 1670–1677
 Charles Sackville, 6th Earl of Dorset 1677–1706
For later custodes rotulorum, see Lord Lieutenant of Sussex.

References

Institute of Historical Research - Custodes Rotulorum 1544-1646
Institute of Historical Research - Custodes Rotulorum 1660-1828

Sussex
History of Sussex
Local government in East Sussex
Local government in West Sussex